The 1976–77 season is Juventus Football Club's 79nd in existence and in the top-flight of Italian football.

Summary
In the 75th Serie A championship - Torino began as title holders- Juventus changes started with Giovanni Trapattoni now being manager of the team, and newcomers Roberto Boninsegna and Romeo Benetti having replaced Pietro Anastasi and Fabio Capello to reinforce the squad.

A memorable season for the city of Turin due to rivals and last year champions Torino finished in 2nd place with a massive 50 points and just one behind first place Juventus winners of the title.

Four days before clinch its 17th Serie A trophy, the team won the UEFA Cup first confederation competition of its history, defeating basque side Athletic Bilbao in the Final at San Mames.

Squad

(Captain)

Competitions

Serie A

League table

Results by round

Matches

Coppa Italia

UEFA Cup

Final

Statistics

Topscorers
23 goals	
  Roberto Bettega

20 goals
  Roberto Boninsegna

7 goals
  Franco Causio
  Marco Tardelli

6 goals
  Romeo Benetti

4 goals
  Antonello Cuccureddu

2 goals
  Giuseppe Furino
  Sergio Gori
  Gaetano Scirea

1 goal
  Antonio Cabrini
  Lorenzo Cascella
  Francesco Della Monica
  Fabio Francisca
  Claudio Gentile

References

External links 
 

Juventus F.C. seasons
Juventus
Italian football championship-winning seasons
UEFA Europa League-winning seasons